Ceratodon is a genus of mosses belonging to the family Ditrichaceae.

The genus was first described by Samuel Elisée Bridel-Brideri.

The genus has cosmopolitan distribution.

Species:
 Ceratodon conicus
 Ceratodon purpureus

References

Dicranales
Moss genera